is a Japanese ice hockey player for DK Peregrine and the Japanese national team. The Japanese team participated at the 2015 IIHF Women's World Championship coming third in their preliminary group. They also participated at the 2015 27th Winter Universiade, winning a bronze medal.

Koike competed at both the 2014 and the 2018 Winter Olympics.

References

External links

1993 births
Living people
Olympic ice hockey players of Japan
Ice hockey players at the 2014 Winter Olympics
Ice hockey players at the 2018 Winter Olympics
Ice hockey players at the 2022 Winter Olympics
Japanese women's ice hockey defencemen
Universiade medalists in ice hockey
Universiade bronze medalists for Japan
Competitors at the 2015 Winter Universiade
People from Tochigi, Tochigi
Asian Games medalists in ice hockey
Ice hockey players at the 2011 Asian Winter Games
Ice hockey players at the 2017 Asian Winter Games
Medalists at the 2011 Asian Winter Games
Medalists at the 2017 Asian Winter Games
Asian Games gold medalists for Japan
Asian Games silver medalists for Japan